The referendum of La Manga del Cura status was held in La Manga del Cura zone on 27 September 2015 to decide to which Ecuadorian province it would belong.

Although in previous years there were four provinces that claimed this sector as part of their territory, Guayas and Manabí remained firm in their arguments but given that this territorial dispute could not be resolved at the level of other instances it was due to call a popular consultation as contemplated by law.

The National Electoral Council of Ecuador determined that the consultation would take place on September 27, 2015, and 15,342 people would participate. This number was determined after an Electoral Census that the NEC conducted in that sector.

The term designated by the National Electoral Council for the electoral campaign by the prefectures of the provinces of Guayas and Manabí was September 19 to 24, 2015.

The preparations for the referendum began during the month of September. On September 21, 2015, a simulacrum was held in the Santa María La Guayas electoral precinct. The process was carried out on September 27, 2015, at 54 Voting Receiving Boards, although two days before the official date, attended suffrage was carried out in the home of persons with disabilities. It was attended by international control bodies, such as the electoral authority of Peru and representatives of USAN, as well as with the collaboration of the Armed Forces and approximately 520 National Police personnel. The budget allocated for the referendum was $515,975.63.

Results
These were the results:

References

Referendums in Ecuador
2015 in Ecuador
2015 referendums
Border polls